Danko Jones, is a Canadian rock singer, guitarist and composer. He is the main singer and guitarist of his self-titled rock trio, which was formed in 1996. Also he contributes as a music journalist for The Huffington Post, Close-Up Magazine, Rock Zone Magazine and Burning Guitars.

Biography
Born and raised in Toronto. When he was six, he played for the first time on an acoustic guitar, and later, when he got into rock music, he got for Christmas a new electric guitar.

While studying at high school, he was the bassist in his first music group 3 Reasons to Puke (3RP) along with guitarist KongDuro.

In 2004 he released a spoken word album.

A book about Jones authored by Stuart Berman was released in October 2012: Too Much Trouble: A Very Oral History of Danko Jones.

On 12 June 2018 was published his book I've Got Something to Say.

In September 2020 he announced vocal noise project Throat Funeral, which has released album OU812112.

Gear and equipment
Jones' main guitars since 2012 have been Gibson SGs. The first was a 2011 Melody Maker in Satin White, bought for $400 when shooting the video for It's a Beautiful Day. The stock 491T pickup had been swapped for a P-94T.

In 2014, he switched to that year's Standard model in Alpine White, and the Melody Maker was relegated to a backup. Live photos from early 2015 also show he used a black 2012 Standard P-90/

Between 2002–2005, he used a cherry Fender Telecaster, and from 2006 he used that year's Black Gibson Explorer Standard, also with a P-94T swapped in as per his 2011 Melody Maker.

Discography

With The Violent Brothers
 The Violent Brothers (1995)

With Danko Jones

Studio albums
 Born a Lion (2002) 
 We Sweat Blood (2003) 
 Sleep Is the Enemy (2006) 
 Never Too Loud (2008) 
 Below the Belt (2010) 
 Rock and Roll is Black and Blue (2012) 
 Fire Music (2015) 
 Wild Cat (2017)
 A Rock Supreme (2019)
 Power Trio (2021)

EPs
 Danko Jones EP (1998) 
 My Love Is Bold (1999) 
 Mouth to Mouth (2011)

Compilations
 I'm Alive and On Fire (2001) 
 B-Sides (2009) 
 This Is Danko Jones (2009) 
 Garage Rock! – A Collection of Lost Songs from 1996–1998 (2014)
 Danko Jones (2015)

Live albums
 Live at Wacken (2016)

With Iron Magazine

EP
 Queen of Hell (2017)

With Throat Funeral
 OU812112 (2020)

As guest singer and writer
 2003: "I Gotta Calm" by Removal
 2004: "Friends" by Backyard Babies
 2007: "Couple Suicide" by Annihilator
 2007: "The Real Johnny Charm" by Puny Human
 2010: "Last Ride" by Asylum On The Hill
 2010: "The One" by Ektomorf
 2011: "That's Enough Boys" by Supagroup
 2012: "I'm So High" by Nashville Pussy
 2013: "Wrapped" by Annihilator
 2014: "I Can't Relax", "Lycanthrope" and "Jasmine Cyanide" by Marty Friedman
 2014: "Don't Wanna Hear About Your Band!" by Tiger Bell
 2014: "5000 Miles" by John Garcia
 2017: "Black Rose" by Volbeat
 2017: "Open Your Eyes (2017 Version)" by Guano Apes
 2017: "Get Yer Hands Dirty" by Brian Vollmer
 2017: "Poverty Year" by This Drama
 2019: "Wild Boy" by Romano Nervoso
 2020: "Poisonous Proclamation" by Ritual Dictates
 2021: "Sepulnation" by Sepultura

As solo artist
 The Magical World of Rock (2004)

Videography 
 Sleep Is the Enemy – Live in Stockholm (2006)
 Bring on the Mountain (2012)
 Live at Wacken (2016)

Filmography 
 Full of Regret (2010)
 Had Enough (2010)
 I Think Bad Thoughts (2011)
 The Ballad of Danko Jones (2012)
 Bring on the Mountain (2012)

Books 
 I've Got Something to Say (2018)

Literature

References

Canadian rock singers
Canadian rock guitarists
Year of birth missing (living people)
Living people